Martin Chungong (born 17 February 1957) is the eighth Secretary-General of the Inter-Parliamentary Union (IPU). Chungong, a Cameroonian, is the first non-European and first African to be elected IPU Secretary-General. He assumed this post on 1 July 2014.

Early life and education
Martin Chungong attended the University of Yaoundé, from where he has a post-graduate degree. He then went to the University of Ottawa, where he obtained a master's degree in Applied Linguistics in 1982. He also holds a post-graduate diploma from the Polytechnic of Central London (now the University of Westminster). He is fluent in English, French and Spanish.

Career
Chungong worked at the National Assembly of Cameroon for 14 years, including as the Administrative Secretary for Cameroon's representation to the IPU.  He also taught linguistics, translation in the Universities of Buea and Yaoundé in Cameroon.

Joining the IPU in 1993, he worked on parliamentary capacity-building in countries in transition or emerging from conflict, and served as Director for the Promotion of Democracy (2005-2011) and Director of the Division of Programmes (2011-2014). He also served as Secretary of the IPU Standing Committee on Democracy and Human Rights for eight years.

In 2012, Chungong became Deputy Secretary-General of the IPU.

Secretary-General
In 2014, Martin Chungong became the first non-European and first African to be elected Secretary-General of the IPU in the organization's 125 years. He was re-elected for a second term at the IPU Assembly in Dhaka in 2017.

As the head of the IPU, Chungong develops programmes to help parliaments become stronger, more gender-sensitive and more representative. As chair of the Management Committee on Accountability of the Organisation for Economic Co-operation and Development (OECD) Governance Network, he has introduced governance guidelines on strengthening democracy.

Chungong is the Parliamentary Representative on the Steering Committee of the Global Partnership for Effective Development Cooperation, a multi-stakeholder group that works to achieve the Sustainable Development Goals through cooperation between various sectors, such as governments, parliaments, private sector, multilateral organizations, civil society and trade unions.

As part of his work on gender equality, Chungong is the Chair of the Global Board of the International Gender Champions. He is also a Champion of the UN Programme to end violence against women in armed conflict.

Chungong was appointed by then UN Secretary-General Ban Ki-moon to shape the efforts of the Scaling Up Nutrition (SUN) movement in eliminating all forms of malnutrition.

He sits on the Board of the Partnership for Maternal, Newborn and Child Health (PMNCH).

He is a member of the High-Level Commission on the Nairobi Summit on ICPD25 (25 years after the International Conference on Population and Development) Follow-up.

Personal life
He is married to Stella Chungong, a medical doctor. They have two adult children, Cindy and Martin Jr.

Awards
 Chevalier de l’Ordre de la Pléiade (International Organisation of La Francophonie)
 Friendship Order (Viet Nam National Assembly)
 Officer of the National Order of 27 June 1977 (Djibouti)
 Distinction from the Council of the Federation: 25 years by the Parliament of the Russian Federation

References

External links 
 Scaling Up Nutrition, 9 July 2018. IPU Secretary-General encourages Speakers of Parliament to accelerate actions to end all forms of malnutrition 
 IPU, 21 August 2017. IPU Secretary General Martin Chungong (Cameroon) on what is special about democracy? 
 IPU, 27 June 2018. International Day of Parliamentarism: Martin Chungong, IPU Secretary General 
 iKNOW Politics, 15 March 2017. Interview with Martin Chungong, IPU Secretary General 
 Martin Chungong, World Economic Forum, 5 October 2017. Democratic institutions are under assault. But we can still save them 
 Daily Motion, 14 September 2015. Entretien du jour avec Martin Chungong 

1957 births
Living people
Inter-Parliamentary Union
People of international organizations